In mathematics, a Picard modular group, studied by , is a group of the form SU(J,L), where L is a 3-dimensional lattice over the ring of integers of an imaginary quadratic field and J is a hermitian form on L of  signature (2, 1). Picard modular groups act on the unit sphere in C2 and the quotient is called a Picard modular surface.

See also

Fuchsian group
Kleinian group

References

Group theory
Automorphic forms